This is a list of members of the  New Democratic Party Shadow Cabinet of the 40th Canadian parliament.  Positions in the shadow cabinet were announced on November 17, 2008, and include all 37 members of the New Democratic Party caucus in the House of Commons of Canada except Joe Comartin who was running for election as Speaker of the House of Commons of Canada when the shadow cabinet was appointed.

{| class="wikitable"
! Portfolio !! Critic !! Duration
|-
| Leader (Critic for the Prime Minister of Canada)
| rowspan=2 | Hon. Jack Layton
| 2003–2011
|-
| Intergovernmental Affairs
| 2007–2011
|-
| rowspan=2 | Deputy Leader
| Libby Davies
| 2004–
|-
| Thomas Mulcair
| 2007–
|-
| Agriculture and Agri-Food
| Alex Atamanenko
| 2006–2011
|-
| Atlantic Canada Opportunities Agency
| Jack Harris
| 2008–2011
|-
| Canadian Heritage and Status of Women (Canadian Heritage)
| Charlie Angus
| 2008–2011
|-
| Status of Women
| Irene Mathyssen
| 2007–2011
|-
| Citizenship and Immigration
| Olivia Chow
| 2007–2011
|-
| Economic Development Agency of Canada for the Regions of Quebec
| Thomas Mulcair
| 2007–2011
|-
| Environment
| Linda Duncan
| 2008–2011
|-
| Finance
| Thomas Mulcair
| 2007–2011
|-
| Fisheries and Oceans
| Peter Stoffer
| 1997–2011
|-
| Foreign Affairs
| Paul Dewar
| 2007–
|-
| Health
| Megan Leslie
| 2010–2011
|-
| Human Resources and Social Development
| Tony Martin
| 2004–2011
|-
| Human Resources and Social Development (Employment Insurance)
| Yvon Godin
| 2007–2011
|-
| Indian Affairs and Northern Development (Aboriginals)
| Jean Crowder
| 2006–2011
|-
| Indian Affairs and Northern Development (Northern Development and Sovereignty )
| Dennis Bevington
| 2006–2011
|-
| Industry
| Brian Masse
| 2008–2011
|-
| International Cooperation
| John Rafferty
| 2008–2011
|-
| International TradePacific Gateway and the Vancouver-Whistler Olympics
| Peter Julian
| 2004–2011
|-
| rowspan=2 | Justice and Shadow Attorney General
| Libby Davies
| 2008–2009
|-
| Joe Comartin
| 2009–
|-
| Labour
| Chris Charlton
| 2008–2011
|-
| House Leader
| Libby Davies
| 2003–2011
|-
| National Defence
| Jack Harris
| 2006–
|-
| National Revenue
| Carol Hughes
| 2008–2011
|-
| Natural Resources
| Nathan Cullen
| 2008–2011
|-
| Public Safety
| Jack Harris
| 2008–2011
|-
| Public Works and Government Services and Crown Corporations
| Pat Martin
| 2008–2011
|-
| Transport, Infrastructure and Communities
| Dennis Bevington
| 2008–2011
|-
| Treasury Board
| Pat Martin
| 2008–2011
|-
| Veterans Affairs
| Peter Stoffer
| 2004–
|-
| Western Economic Diversification
| Don Davies
| 2008–2011
|-
| Atlantic Gateway
| Jack Harris
| 2008–
|-Deputy Critics
|-
| Food Security and Agriculture
| Malcolm Allen
| 2008–2011
|-
| Finance
| Chris Charlton
| 2008–2011
|-
| Citizenship and Immigration
| Don Davies
| 2008–2011
|-
| Industry (Mines)
| Claude Gravelle
| 2008–2011
|-
| Energy (Atlantic Region)
| Jack Harris
| 2008–2011
|-
| First Nations, Métis, and Inuit Affairs (Health)
| Carol Hughes
| 2008–2011
|-
| Environment (National Parks)
| rowspan=3 | Bruce Hyer
| 2008–
|-
| Environment (Water)
| rowspan=2 | 2008–2011
|-
| Environment (Climate Change)
|-
| Fisheries (West Coast)
| Peter Julian
| 2008–2011
|-
| First Nations, Métis and Inuit Affairs (Urban Issues)
| rowspan=2 | Megan Leslie
| rowspan=2 | 2008–2011
|-
| Justice
|-
| Public Works (E-government)
| Jim Maloway
| 2008–2011
|-
| Industry (Steel)
| Wayne Marston
| 2004–2011
|-
| Agriculture (Canada Wheat Board) and Energy (Energy Retrofits)
| Pat Martin
| 2008–2011
|-
| Public Safety
| Irene Mathyssen
| 2008–2011
|-
| Industry (Forestry)
| rowspan=3 | John Rafferty
| rowspan=3 | 2008–2011
|-
| Canadian Heritage (Canadian Broadcasting Corporation)
|-
| Cultural Industries
|-
| Foreign Affairs (Americas)
| Denise Savoie
| 2008–2011
|-
| Industry (Shipbuilding)
| Peter Stoffer
| 1997–2010
|-
| colspan=3| Critics for Special Ministerial Responsibilities
|-
| Democratic Reform
| David Christopherson
| 2008–
|-
| Federal Economic Development Initiative for Northern Ontario
| rowspan=2 | Claude Gravelle
| rowspan=2 | 2008–2011
|-
| La Francophonie and Official Languages
|-
| Shadow Federal Interlocutor for Métis and Non-Status Indians
| Jean Crowder
| 2006–2011
|-
| Sport
| Glenn Thibeault
| 2006–2011
|-
| colspan=3| Critics for Policy Areas for which there is no specific minister
|-
| Skills Training and Apprenticeships
| Malcolm Allen
| 2008–2011
|-
| Digital Issues
| Charlie Angus
| 2008–
|-
| Youth
| rowspan=3 | Niki Ashton
| rowspan=3 | 2008–2011
|-
| Rural Development
|-
| Community Development
|-
| Food Security
| Alex Atamanenko
| 2008–2011
|-
| Public Accounts
| rowspan=2 | David Christopherson
| 2005–
|-
| Canada Post
| 2008–2011
|-
| Multiculturalism
| rowspan=2 | Don Davies
| 2008–
|-
| Vancouver Region
| 2008–2011
|-
| Substance Abuse
| rowspan=2 | Libby Davies
| rowspan=2 | 2008–2011
|-
| Prostitution Issues
|-
| Small Business
| rowspan=2 | Bruce Hyer
| rowspan=2 | 2008–2011
|-
| Tourism
|-
| Post-Secondary Education
| rowspan=2 | Megan Leslie
| rowspan=2 | 2008–2009
|-
| Literacy
|-
| Science and Technology
| Jim Maloway
| 2008–2011
|-
| Seniors and Pensions and Human Rights
| Wayne Marston
| 2008–
|-
| Housing
| rowspan=3 | Denise Savoie
| rowspan=3 | 2008–2011
|-
| Homelessness
|-
| Canada Mortgage and Housing Corporation
|-
| Privacy and Ethics
| rowspan=2 | Bill Siksay
| rowspan=2 | 2008–2011
|-
| Gay, Lesbian, Bisexual, Transsexual, and Transgender Issues
|-
| Consumer Protection
| Glenn Thibeault
| 2008–
|-
| Persons with Disabilities
| Judy Wasylycia-Leis
| 2008–
|-
| colspan=3| Caucus roles
|-
| NDP Whip
| Yvon Godin
| 
|-
| rowspan=2 | NDP Caucus Chair
| Judy Wasylycia-Leis
| 2004–2009
|-
| Jean Crowder
| 2009–2011
|}

The NDP does not have a leader in the Senate of Canada since it opposes the existence of that body.

See also
Cabinet of Canada
Official Opposition (Canada)
Shadow Cabinet
Official Opposition Shadow Cabinet (Canada)
Bloc Québécois Shadow Cabinet

History of the New Democratic Party (Canada)
40th Canadian Parliament
Canadian shadow cabinets